University Preparatory Academy (UPA) is a charter school located in San Jose, California, United States. Its charter was approved by the Santa Clara Board of Trustees. UPA opened in the fall of 2007 as a middle and high school, offering grades 7–12th. As of 2020, approximately 650 students attend UPA with a 21:1 student-teacher ratio.

In 2020, UPA was ranked the 120th best high school in the nation and the 13th best in California by U.S. News & World Report.

Background

UPA was founded as University Preparatory Academy in 2007. Graduation standards are more rigorous than at other high schools, requiring more AP units than is mandated by California laws.

UPA's campus is located near downtown San Jose in the Willow Glen area. It shares its campus with the Cathedral of Faith, and features its own outdoors amphitheater.

Available courses

Core classes
Mathematics - Common Core (Math 7, Math 8, Integrated Math 1, Integrated Math 2, Integrated Math 3, Integrated Math 3+), Statistics, Pre-Calculus, AP Calculus AB, AP Calculus BC 
English - English 7-12, AP Language and Composition, AP Literature and Composition
Foreign Languages - Spanish 1, Spanish 2, Spanish 3, Spanish Immersion, AP Spanish Language, AP Spanish Literature
Science - Life Science, Physical Science, Biology, Chemistry, Physics, AP Environmental Science, AP Biology, AP Chemistry, Marine Biology
History - Ancient Civilizations, American History, World Geography, World History, U.S. History, Economics, AP U.S. Government and Politics, AP World History, AP U.S. History

Clubs
University Preparatory Academy has a number of clubs, founded and funded mostly by students and widely ranging in theme.

Speech and Debate
Interact Club 5170 Area 7
EcoSquad
GirlUp!
International Biology Olympiad
Science Olympiad
Web Design Club
Design Club
Innovation, Design, Engineering and Animation Club (IDEA)
Creature Conservation Club
Korean Culture Club (대박!)
ARK Club (Acts of Random Kindness)
Spanish Club (Unidad Poder Academico)
Filipino Culture Club (Hawak-Kamay)
BARC (Big-hearted Animal Rescue Club)
Inter-Key Club
SNAP Fundraiser Club
Robotics Club
FBLA (Future Business Leaders of America)
Girls Who Code Club
Hack Club

Athletics
The UPA Golden Eagles field 12 teams in 4 sports, with both middle school and varsity teams. The Golden Eagles compete in the Private School Athletic League of the CIF Central Coast Section.

Theatre and Dance Department
Each year UPA hosts two drama productions (a fall play and spring musical) and a fall dance showcase every spring by the students in dance classes at the school. Students can audition to perform in the theatre productions or apply to be on technical crews or part of the band for musicals. Below is a list of some of UPA's previous shows.
20102011: Lovers' Quarrels, You're a Good Man, Charlie Brown
20112012: I Hate Shakespeare!, Grease
20122013: 30 Reasons NOT To Be In A Play, Once On This Island
20132014: The Broken Badge, Hairspray
20142015: Snow Angel, Once Upon A Mattress
20152016: Spy School, Footloose
20162017: The End of the World (With Prom to Follow), Singin' in the Rain
20172018: Emma!

Events
University Preparatory Academy holds schoolwide events. Such events include:
The Annual Jog-a-thon — Students jog laps in the school parking lot to raise funds for the school athletics program.
School Dances — Many dances are held throughout the year, including Homecoming, the Halloween Dance, Spring Dance, and Prom.
Friday Movie Nights — On occasion, the entire school is invited to watch a movie of their choice on a Friday.
Drama Productions — These are showcased twice every year, and UPA students are recruited to act in or support a play. Typically, the finished products are showcased in fall and spring.
Junior College Trip — Once a year, junior students are taken on a trip to southern California to tour colleges, such as the University of California, Los Angeles,  the University of California, Irvine, California Polytechnic State University, and others. Students on this trip learn about the application process and familiarize themselves with college campuses.
Annual College Trip — Each class visits a regional university to ready themselves for graduation from high school and entrance into college. Schools visited include Stanford University, the University of California, Berkeley, and the University of California, Santa Cruz.

Developers/founders
Daniel Ordaz — Education Consultant, Retired Assistant Superintendent of East Side Union High School District
Jacklyn Guevara — Retired Executive Director of East Side Union High School District
Dorothy Westerhoff — Education Consultant, Retired Educator/School Administrator of East Side Union High School District
Kurt Foreman — Director of Operations for Cathedral of Faith

References

External links
UPA's Developers/Founders
UPA's Website
UPA's Sports Site
UPA video
Journalism Website

High schools in San Jose, California
Charter schools in California
Public high schools in California
Public middle schools in California
Charter schools in the United States
2007 establishments in California